Central Partnership is a Russian film distribution and production company founded in 1995. The distributor was acquired by Russian gas company Gazprom in 2014.

History 
Central Partnership started as a TV content distributor in 1995-2000. Central Partnership also produces high-end TV series. Central Partnership is promoting the Russian titles overseas. In November 2005 the controlling stake of Central Partnership was acquired by Prof Media.

In January 2009 Central Partnership became an official distributor of the Paramount Pictures lineup in Russia and CIS (Ukraine excluded). Shrek Forever After, an animated comedy blockbuster by DreamWorks Animation, became the highest-grossing animation of all time in Russia.

Films and library 
 On the Nameless Height
 Volkodav from the Grey Hound Clan
 Young Volkodav
 1612
 You and I
 The Sovereign's Servant
 Shadowboxing (2005 film)
 Legend of Kolovrat
 Mission «Sky» (2021)

 The distribution rights to Paramount Pictures' post-2009 library.
 Post-2021 the distribution rights of Miramax films.
 The distribution rights to Lionsgate post-2017 library.
 Post-2005 the distribution rights of Summit Entertainment.

References

External links 
 Central Partnership at IMDb
 Official website - English
  Official website - Russian

1995 establishments in Russia
Russian film studios
Russian brands
Companies established in 1995
Film production companies of Russia
Companies based in Moscow